A pathologists’ assistant (PA) is a physician extender whose expertise lies in gross examination of surgical specimens as well as performing forensic, medicolegal, and hospital autopsies.

General overview 
PAs work under the indirect or direct supervision of a board certified anatomical pathologist, who ultimately renders a diagnosis based on the PA's detailed gross examination and/or tissue submission for microscopic evaluation. Requirements to become a pathologists' assistant include graduation from a National Accrediting Agency for Clinical Laboratory Sciences (NAACLS) accredited education program and successfully passing the American Society for Clinical Pathology (ASCP) certification exam, which is not legally required in most states.  The credentialing is a certification from the ASCP. Some states such as Nevada and New York require a license. All pathologists' assistants are allied health workers who need to be CLIA 88 compliant to perform these high complexity tasks with indirect/direct supervision. With ongoing changes in health care, a growing elderly population, and a decreasing number of pathology residents, the PA is in high demand due to their high level of training and contribution to the overall efficiency of the pathology laboratory.

In addition to the major responsibilities outlined above, a pathologists' assistant may also perform the following tasks (for a complete list, refer to Article III, Section B of the AAPA Bylaws):

 Frozen sectioning for intraoperative consultation
 Preparing tissue samples for flow cytometry, immunohistochemical (IHC) stains, genetic testing, microbiology culturing, and for various other laboratory evaluations
 Gross specimen photography
 Training PA fellows, pathology residents, and other pathology lab personnel (as needed)
 Fulfilling roles in managerial duties, instructional positions, and supervisory roles
 Researching

While many PAs are employed in hospitals, they may also gain employment in private pathology laboratories/groups, medical examiner's offices, morgues, government or reference laboratories, or universities, and may be self-employed and provide contract work. According to a study published in Autonomic Pathology, PAs perform gross examinations on 56.5% of the total number of specimens submitted industry-wide, with a majority being biopsies.

History of profession 
The idea of physician extenders was conceived in 1966 by physician-educator Eugene A. Stead at Duke University, where the first physician assistant program was established. Three years later, also at Duke, Chairman of Pathology Dr. Thomas Kinney established the first pathologists’ assistant program. To date, fourteen accredited programs have been established across the United States and Canada.

Education 
Programs can apply to be NAACLS accredited. Attending an accredited program is currently the only route to certification by the ASCP-BOC. PathA programs collectively graduate approximately 118 students a year. As of 2010, just over 1,400 pathologists’ assistants are in practice. The programs vary in details, but are two-year programs at the masters level, and include didactic and clinical exposure. The didactic year commonly includes an education in clinical anatomy, neuroscience, physiology, histology, pathology, pathologists’ assistant (clinical correlation)- specific courses, medical terminology, and inter-professional classes. Students then are placed in a clinical setting in affiliated hospitals and medical examiner's offices to learn prosection and autopsy techniques hands-on.

Universities granting pathology assistant degrees include:

 Drexel University* Master of Science in Pathologists’ Assistant Studies
 Duke University* Master of Health Science
 Indiana University* Master of Science
 Quinnipiac University* Master of Health Science
 Rosalind Franklin University* Master of Science in Pathologists' Assistant Studies
 University of Maryland Baltimore* Master of Science in Pathology
 University of Western Ontario* Master of Clinical Science in Pathologists'Assistant Studies
 Wayne State University* Master of Science in Pathologists' Assistant Studies
 West Virginia University*- Master of Health Science
 University of Calgary*- Master of Pathologists' Assistant
 Loma Linda University*- Master of Health Science/ Pathologists' Assistant
 University of Toledo**- Master of Science in Biomedical Science
 Eastern Virginia Medical School*- Master of Pathologists' Assistant
 Tulane University***- Master of Science in Anatomic Pathology
As of 9/1/2017, the programs above have the following status with the National Accrediting Agency for Clinical Laboratory Sciences:

|*| Accredited

|**| Serious Applicant Status

|***| Submitted documentation to become accredited

Education and certification 
Pathologists' assistants have been employed in pathology labs for over 40 years. Formal training programs slowly appeared (there were four nationwide in the late 1990s). NAACLS began accrediting PathA programs in the late 1990s, and then programs slowly continued their transitions from bachelor's to master's programs as their number increased. Prior to ASCP certification, which came about in 2005, the AAPA had a fellowship status that program trained pathologists' assistants or on-the-job trained (OJT) pathologists' assistants (who could do specific coursework and three years of active employment) could join only based on passing a rigorous exam that parallels the current ASCP certification exam. The OJT route was eliminated at the end of 2007. The professional association uniting PAs is the American Association of Pathologists' Assistants. Part of their duties as an association is to provide continuing medical education credits (CME) in order to keep members current on advances and procedures in the field that must be completed every three years in order to maintain ASCP certification.

In Popular Culture
The 2020 novel The Grave Below features a Pathologists’ Assistant as a prominent character.

References

 http://www.pathassist.org
 http://naacls.org/
 https://archive.today/20120713121733/http://rosalindfranklin.edu/dnn/chp/home/CHP/PathologistsAssistant/tabid/1459/Default.aspx
https://web.archive.org/web/20131113050308/http://www.pathassistconsulting.com/

Pathology